Bagdal  is a small town in Bidar taluka of Bidar district in the Indian state of Karnataka.

Demographics
 the India census, Bagdal had a population of 8,952, with 4,614 males and 4,338 females.

See also
 Districts of Karnataka

References

External links
 http://Bidar.nic.in/

Villages in Bidar district